Głowin  is a village in the administrative district of Gmina Zbiczno, within Brodnica County, Kuyavian-Pomeranian Voivodeship, in north-central Poland.

References

Villages in Brodnica County